Arthur Jules Morin (19 October 1795 – 7 February 1880) was a French physicist. He conducted experiments in mechanics and invented the Morin dynamometer. He introduced the term coefficient of friction and demonstrated its utility.

In 1850, he was elected a foreign member of the Royal Swedish Academy of Sciences.  His name is one of the 72 names inscribed on the Eiffel Tower. He was conferred with Honorary Membership of the Institution of Engineers and Shipbuilders in Scotland in 1859. He was named as one of the 23 "Men of Tribology" by Duncan Dowson.

References

External links
 Morin biography at St Andrews University

French physicists
1795 births
1880 deaths
Members of the French Academy of Sciences
Members of the Royal Swedish Academy of Sciences
Tribologists